Carex fascicularis, commonly known as tassel sedge, is a species of sedge of the family Cyperaceae that is native to Australia, New Zealand and New Guinea.

Description
The sedge is densely tufted and is able to spread using short underground stems. It blooms between Spring to early Summer from September to November in Western Australia producing green flowers. In Victoria it flowers from November to April.

Taxonomy
The species was described by Francis Boott in 1853 as a part of Joseph Dalton Hooker's work Flora Novae-Zelandiae. It has three synonyms; Carex fascicularis var. minor, Carex novae-selandiae and Carex pseudocyperus var. fascicularis.

Distribution
In Western Australia is found in swamps and along creek and rivers throughout a large area of the Peel, South West and Great Southern regions where it grows in black peaty-sandy soils. It is commonly found elsewhere in an aquatic to semi-aquatic environment growing in damp to wet soils in part or dappled shade. In South Australia it is found south of Adelaide, South Australia extended eastwards into southern Victoria and then north into New South Wales and Queensland where it is found in coastal areas.

See also
List of Carex species

References

fascicularis
Plants described in 1853
Flora of Western Australia
Taxa named by Francis Boott
Flora of Victoria (Australia)
Flora of South Australia
Flora of New South Wales
Flora of Tasmania
Flora of the North Island
Flora of New Guinea